Saracen Cycles, known simply as "Saracen" is a bicycle brand sold in the United Kingdom, Europe and Asia.  Originally based in Warwick, England, the company is best known for its range of mountain bikes.

Started in 1983, Saracen was a market leader during the early 1990s. In 2009, the brand was acquired by Madison, a significant distributor of bicycles, parts and accessories which in turn is part of the H. Young group of companies. Madison, based in Stanmore, Middlesex, also owns the Genesis and Ridgeback cycle brands. The Saracen brand is now operated out of Madison premises in Milton Keynes.

Madison Saracen Downhill Team 

Since being acquired by Madison the Saracen brand has undergone significant investment and development, helped in part by the formation of the Madison Saracen Downhill Team. This development-focussed team launched in 2011 and has a number of notable accolades to date including multiple World Cup podiums, a 2011 Junior World Cup winner, 2011 Junior World Champion and a Bronze medal at the 2012 World Championships, thanks to team rider Manon Carpenter.

Since the start of the 2012 season the Madison Saracen team has been managed by former Mountain Biking UK rider and manager, Will Longden.

In January 2013 the team announced the addition of Sam Dale to the team, with Manon Carpenter, Harry Molloy and Phil Atwill all staying on the team.

Downhill Team Roster 
2013

2011-2012

The team rides on the Saracen Myst downhill bike.

Team Riders 

In its early days Saracen was the home of two of the best known UK Downhill Mountain Bikers, Matt Davis and Rob Warner.

Saracen was famous for its MAD trails display team, up until 2006 when it was sold.

UK Dirt Jumper Lance McDermott signed for Saracen in 2010 on a 3 year deal. Blake Samson joined Lance McDermott on the dirt jump team in 2012. Blake is a regular fixture on the Animal Bike Tour with fellow Animal rider, Martyn Ashton.

List of Current Bikes (2013) 

Downhill

Myst Team
Myst Pro
Myst X (Frameset)

All-Mountain

Ariel 161
Ariel 162
Ariel 16X (Frameset)

Suspension Trail

Ariel 141
Ariel 142
Ariel 143
Ariel 14X (Frameset)

Aluminium Hardtail

Mantra
Mantra Pro
Mantra Trail
Mantra Expert
Mantra Elite

Zen

Kili
Kili Pro
Kili Trail
Kili  Expert
Kili Elite

Dirt Jump

Amplitude CR2
Amplitude CR3
Amplitude CRX (Frameset)
Amplitude ALX (Framset)

See also 
List of bicycle manufacturing companies

References

External links 
 

Cycle manufacturers of the United Kingdom